Piggott School District is a public school district based in Piggott, Arkansas, United States. The school district encompasses  of land, including portions of Clay County and serving communities such as Piggott, Pollard, Nimmons, and Saint Francis.

The district proves comprehensive education for more than 1,000 pre-kindergarten through grade 12 students and is accredited by the Arkansas Department of Education (ADE) and AdvancED.

Schools 
 Piggott High School, located in Piggott and serving more than 450 students in grades 7 through 12.
 Piggott Elementary School, located in Piggott and serving more than 500 students in pre-kindergarten through grade 6.

References

External links 
 

School districts in Arkansas
Education in Clay County, Arkansas